Simon Anthony John Brain (born 31 March 1966) is an English retired footballer who played as a striker. He started his career with Evesham United before moving on to Cheltenham Town then of the Football Conference. A move to Hereford United soon came in December 1990.

His career was blighted by broken legs suffering two breaks in his short league career at Hereford United the second break in a Welsh Cup tie against Mostyn ended his professional career. He later played non-league football for Bromsgrove Rovers, Evesham United, Malvern Town, Worcester Athletico, Pershore Town and Littleton.

His uncle, Sid Brain, was a prolific goalscorer at Evesham United.

He has a wife and two children. One of which is called Nathan who was born in 1994. His daughter who is 27 (birthday 4 March 1996) is named Hollie Alice Brain.

References

External links
Simon Brain profile at HU-FC.co.uk

1966 births
Living people
English footballers
Evesham United F.C. players
Cheltenham Town F.C. players
Hereford United F.C. players
Bromsgrove Rovers F.C. players
Malvern Town F.C. players
Pershore Town F.C. players
Littleton F.C. players
English Football League players
National League (English football) players
Association football forwards